The women's 100 m backstroke swimming events for the 2016 Summer Paralympics take place at the Rio Olympic Stadium from 8 to 17 September. A total of ten events are contested for ten different classifications.

Competition format
Each event consists of two rounds: heats and final. The top eight swimmers overall in the heats progress to the final. If there are less than eight swimmers in an event, no heats are held and all swimmers qualify for the final.

Results

S2

The S2 event took place on 9 September.

S6

The S6 event took place on 8 September.

S7

The S7 event took place on 8 September.

S8

The S8 event took place on 13 September.

S9

The S9 event took place on 16 September.

S10

The S10 event took place on 10 September.

S11

The S11 event took place on 9 September.

S12

The S12 event took place on 14 September.

S13

The S13 event took place on 17 September.

S14

The S14 event took place on 8 September.

References

Swimming at the 2016 Summer Paralympics